Chloroclystis athaumasta is a moth in the family Geometridae. It was described by Turner in 1908. It is found in Australia (Queensland).

References

External links

Chloroclystis athaumasta from the Atlas of Living Australia

Moths described in 1908
athaumasta
Moths of Australia